Cyberduck may refer to:
 Cyberduck, an open source FTP software
 Cyber-Duck, a digital media agency in North London